Vepris lecomteana, synonym Oricia lecomteana, is a species of plant in the family Rutaceae. It is found in Cameroon, the Republic of the Congo, Gabon and Nigeria. Its natural habitat is subtropical or tropical moist lowland forests. It is threatened by habitat loss.

References

Sources

lecomteana
Vulnerable plants
Taxonomy articles created by Polbot